Raj Popat (born 17 June 1987) is a Welsh male badminton player. In 2007 and 2012, he won the Welsh National Badminton Championships in men's singles event.

Achievements

BWF International Challenge/Series
Mixed Doubles

 BWF International Challenge tournament
 BWF International Series tournament
 BWF Future Series tournament

References

External links
 

1987 births
Living people
Sportspeople from Newport, Wales
Welsh male badminton players